Hans-Peter Schultze (born 13 August 1937 in Swinemünde, Poland) is a German-American paleoichthyologist.

He has described the following taxon:
Luckeus abudda Young & Schultze, 2005

See also
Ichthyolith
Paleozoology

References

Living people
1937 births
German ichthyologists
German paleontologists
People from Świnoujście